Michael Russell (1844 – May 6, 1901) was an American businessman and politician from New York.

Life
He was born in 1844 in Troy, Rensselaer County, New York. He attended the public schools. In 1862, he enlisted as a private in the 169th New York Volunteer Infantry, and fought in the American Civil War, being promoted eventually to the rank of brevet captain. After the war he engaged in the grocery business in Troy, and for some time was employed in the Troy Post Office.
 
Russell was a member of the New York State Assembly (Rensselaer Co., 3rd D.) in 1898, 1899 and 1900. He was a member of the New York State Senate (30th D.) in 1901. During the session he was stricken with apoplexy in the Senate Chamber, and was carried by his fellow senators to the Albany Hospital. On May 2, 1901, he was brought back to his home in Troy, New York, where he died four days later.

Sources

1844 births
1901 deaths
Republican Party New York (state) state senators
Politicians from Troy, New York
Republican Party members of the New York State Assembly
Union Army officers
19th-century American politicians